Kaipara ki Mahurangi is an electorate to the New Zealand House of Representatives.

Population centres
The electorate consists of a large northern section of the Auckland Region. It stretches from the border with Northland to the northwestern end of Waitematā Harbour, and consists mostly of various satellite towns north of Auckland. Population centres within the electorate include:
Wellsford
Warkworth
Snells Beach
Helensville
Waimauku
Huapai
Kumeū
Riverhead
Muriwai

History
Initially, it was proposed to keep the name Helensville, but after opposition from residents in the Kowhai Coast area, that name was scrapped and it was named Kaipara ki Mahurangi instead. The electorate draws its name from two areas of geographic importance, the Kaipara Harbour, in the west of the electorate, and the Mahurangi River, which is located on the eastern end of the constituency. Translated, the name essentially means Kaipara to Mahurangi, or Kaipara-Mahurangi.

Members of Parliament
Key

List MPs
Members of Parliament elected from party lists in elections where that person also unsuccessfully contested the Kaipara ki Mahurangi electorate. Unless otherwise stated, all MPs' terms began and ended at general elections.

Key

Election results

2020 election

References

2020 establishments in New Zealand
New Zealand electorates in the Auckland Region